XO (often typeset as XØ) is the debut album released by Leathermouth, My Chemical Romance's rhythm guitarist Frank Iero's hardcore punk side project. Although the album did not chart on the Billboard 200, it did reach No. 21 on the Top Heatseekers chart.

Lyrical themes
Leathermouth serves as lead singer Frank Iero's first project where he has written lyrics. He has used this band as a way to vent about things that make him angry, and also the issues that have been attached to his depression and anxiety problems. Many songs hit on "topics people want to forget exist" and the album as a whole suggests  that "the world is going to shit, and someone has to say it." The song "5th Period Massacre" reflects Iero's feelings on school shootings and how the entertainment industry is often blamed for these events, and the song "Sunsets Are For Muggings" is about Iero's visits to the psychiatrist, and the mental illnesses in his family. Iero discusses his feelings on the theme of the album:

Lyrics were also inspired by 80s horror films that Iero watched as a child, and many songs on the album were about issues today and used the imagery of 80s horror films to illustrate the points.

Frank Iero  said in a 2009 interview with Alternative Press, the Secret Service paid him a visit regarding his song "I Am Going to Kill the President of the United States of America." He explained that he wrote it when he was touring overseas with My Chemical Romance. He saw Anti-American rallies everyday, and explained that he wrote it from the protester's point of view. The Secret Service told him if he rereleased the song or ever played the song live again that he would be sentenced to five years in prison. This was later proven to be false when the album was rereleased on vinyl in 2018 including the song.

Release
On December 2, 2008, XO was announced for release in January 2009. Also in December, the band performed a handful of shows. On January 8, 2009, "Sunsets Are for Muggings" was posted on the group's Myspace. XO was made available for streaming on January 20, before being released through Epitaph Records on January 27. On February 12, a music video was released for "Bodysnatchers 4 Ever" on the group's Myspace.

Track listing

Personnel
Leathermouth
Frank Iero – Lead vocals
Rob Hughes – Guitar, backing vocals
John McGuire – bass, backing vocals
James Dewees – drums, percussion
Ed Auletta – Guitar

Additional personnel
Produced by Steve Oyolla and Leathermouth in basements throughout the New York and New Jersey area
Mastered by George Marino at Sterling Sound NYC
Record layout by Matt Erny, Casey Howard and Leathermouth

References

External links
Leathermouth Official Website
Leathermouth Official MySpace Page

2009 albums
Leathermouth albums
Epitaph Records albums